Team CCB Foundation–Sicleri is an American UCI Continental cycling team founded in 1980. They are headquartered outside Boston, Massachusetts. The team gained UCI Continental status in 2017.

Team roster

References

UCI Continental Teams (America)
Cycling teams established in 1980
Cycling teams based in the United States